The 1999 international cricket season was from April 1999 to September 1999.

Season overview

May

1999 Cricket World Cup

July

New Zealand in England

August

1999 Aiwa Cup

Australia in Sri Lanka

September

1999 Coca-Cola Singapore Challenge

1999 DMC Cup

1999 DCM Trophy

References

 
1999 in cricket